Evangelical Church of the Palatinate is a United Protestant church in parts of the German states of Rhineland-Palatinate and Saarland, endorsing both Lutheran and Calvinist orientations.

The seat of the church is in Speyer, where Protestation at Speyer happened. During this historical event, German Lutheran princes protested the Reichsacht against Martin Luther and called for unhindered spread of the Protestant faith. As the Roman Catholic party urged for religious unity in the Holy Roman Empire, it dismissed all those participants who argued against an Imperial Ban on Luther as "Protestants"; it has since entered various other languages beside German language, and became a dominant term to describe churches coming out of the Reformation, as well as all these derived from them. It is the only EKD member church to formally use the word Protestant (protestantisch in German language) in its name, since most EKD member churches call themselves Evangelical (evangelisch in German language).

It is a full member of the Evangelical Church in Germany (EKD). The current President of the Church ("Kirchenpräsident") is Dorothee Wüst. The Evangelical Church of the Palatinate is one of 20 Lutheran, United Protestant and Reformed churches of the EKD. As of December 2020, the regional church had 482,731 members in 431 parishes.

The Evangelical Church of the Palatinate is a member of the UEK and of the Community of Protestant Churches in Europe. In Speyer, the church has its own Evangelical academy. The principal church is the Gedächtniskirche in Speyer. Because the church has no bishop, it is not a cathedral.

History
Since 1816, the Palatine Reformed and Lutheran congregations were subordinate to the Protestant church administration of the Kingdom of Bavaria, of which the then Governorate of the Palatinate formed a part. Following the parishioners' plebiscite in 1817, all Palatine Lutheran and Reformed congregations merged into confessionally united Protestant congregations. In 1848, the Palatine Protestant congregations formed a regional church, then called Vereinigte protestantisch-evangelisch-christliche Kirche der Pfalz (Pfälzische Landeskirche) (i.e. United Protestant Evangelical Christian Church of the Palatinate [Palatine State Church]), independent of that regional church in the rest of Bavaria. In 1922, the United Church of the Palatinate counted 506,000 parishioners.

The official Palatine church body became a destroyed church since it was taken over by Nazi-submissive German Christians, who gained a majority in the synod by the unconstitutional election imposed by Adolf Hitler on 23 July 1933. Nazi opponents then formed the Confessing Church of the Palatinate. In 1976, the Palatine church renamed into Evangelische Kirche der Pfalz (Protestantische Landeskirche) (i.e. Evangelical Church of the Palatinate [Protestant State Church]). In 1941 the commander of the CdZ-Gebiet Lothringen subjected the Protestant congregations in that occupation zone of France to the jurisdiction of the United Church of the Palatinate. In 1944 they returned to their previous umbrellas the Reformed Church of Alsace and Lorraine and the Protestant Church of Augsburg Confession of Alsace and Lorraine.

Practices 
Ordination of women and blessing of same-sex marriages were allowed.

Elected leaders 
The leading person is the "Kirchenpräsident" (Church President), until 1921 titled Konsistorialdirektor (consistorial director), which is elected from the synod for seven years.

1886 - 1896: Theodor Michael von Wand, Konsistorialdirektor
1896 - 1915: Ludwig von Wagner, Konsistorialdirektor
1915 - 1930: D. Dr. Karl Fleischmann, Konsistorialdirektor, since 1921 Kirchenpräsident
1930 - 1934: Jakob Kessler, Kirchenpräsident
1934 - 1945: Ludwig Diehl, 
1946 - 1964: Dr. Hans Stempel, Kirchenpräsident
1964 - 1969: Dr. Theodor Schaller, Kirchenpräsident
1969 - 1975: Walter Ebrecht, Kirchenpräsident
1975 - 1988: Heinrich Kron, Kirchenpräsident
1988 - 1998: Werner Schramm (Speyer), Kirchenpräsident
1998 - 2008: Eberhard Cherdron, Kirchenpräsident
2008 - 2021: Christian Schad, Kirchenpräsident
 since 2021: Dorothee Wüst, Kirchenpräsidentin

Books
 Gesangbuch zum gottesdienstlichen Gebrauche für protestantisch-evangelische Christen, Speyer, 1823
 Evangelisch-protestantisches Gesangbuch für Kirche und Haus, Speier
 Gesangbuch für die vereinigte protestantisch-evangelische christliche Kirche der Pfalz, Speyer, 1861 ?
 Evangelisches Kirchen-Gesangbuch - Edition for Vereinigte, protestantisch-evangelische, christliche Kirche der Pfalz, Speyer, 
 , Edition for Evangelische Kirche der Pfalz (Protestantische Landeskirche), Speyer, 1994

Notes

External links 
 http://www.evpfalz.de (Protestant Church of the Palatinate)
 http://www.ekd.de (Evangelical Church in Germany)

Palatinate
Palatinate
Church
Palatinate
Palatinate
Palatinate
Palatinate Church
Calvinist and Reformed denominations